Héctor Germán Oesterheld, also known as his common abbreviation HGO (born July 23, 1919; disappeared and presumed dead 1977), was an Argentine journalist and writer of graphic novels and comics. He has come to be celebrated as a master in his field and as one of the pioneering artists in Argentine modern comics.

Through his comics, Oesterheld criticized the numerous military dictatorships that beleaguered the country in different periods ranging from 1955 to 1983, as well as different facets of capitalism, colonialism and imperialism, choosing a subtle criticism in his early comics during the 1950s and early 1960s, and a stronger and direct approach in his later work, after the execution of Che Guevara in 1967, and onwards from then on: in 1968 he wrote a biographical comic book of Che Guevara, which was subsequently banned by the Argentine Revolution.

During the National Reorganization Process, Oesterheld and his daughters joined the Montoneros, a leftist (and former peronist) guerrilla group that opposed the military junta. HGO continued to publish works in clandestine form while hidden in secret locations, but he was ultimately kidnapped and disappeared. His daughters were also arrested and disappeared, as were his sons-in-law. Only HGO's wife, Elsa, escaped the family's tragic fate.

Over the years, Oesterheld's legacy has become vast, influencing several generations of new artists, particularly in literature and comic books.

Biography
Oesterheld was born in Buenos Aires to a German father and a Spanish  Basque mother. His early studies were in geology, which has been said to contribute to his acuity as a science fiction writer. He began his journalistic career in the early 1940s. His first work appeared in the daily La Prensa newspaper and then was published by Codex. He moved to Abril publishers, where he began his extensive career as a comics writer.

Soon after, he married Elsa Sánchez. Their first daughter, Estela, was born in 1952, Diana a year later, Beatriz in 1955, and Marina in 1957.

Oesterheld was befriended by a group of postwar Italian comics writers, including Mario Faustinelli, Hugo Pratt, Ivo Pavone, and Dino Battaglia, also known as the Venice Group. Together these artists and writers became part of what is known as the "Golden Age of Argentine Comics." They merged into an international scene of artists and writers whose works were published worldwide.

In 1957 Oesterheld and his brother Jorge founded Editorial Frontera. Together they published various comic magazines, including Hora Cero Semanal (weekly), Hora Cero Mensual (monthly), and Frontera Mensual (monthly).

In 1958 he started writing El Eternauta, probably his most popular and critically acclaimed work. The strip, with artwork by Francisco Solano López, told the story of his meeting with a time traveler, who had already lived over 100 lives and has journeyed to the past to warn the protagonist of a future catastrophe. The strip was published in Hora Cero over 106 weekly episodes and was a massive success.

His publishing house closed five years later due to a combination of the economic crisis sweeping Argentina in the 1960s, foreign competition, and the exodus of Argentine comic artists to Europe. Oesterheld continued writing for other magazines such as Zig-Zag.

His work slowly acquired a greater political emphasis. His 1968 biography of Ernesto 'Che' Guevara, a year after Che's death, was removed from circulation by the government and the originals destroyed. In 1970 he wrote a scathing critical biography of Evita Peron, dedicated to Che Guevara. In 1973 he published 450 Years of War Against Imperialism. During the military government of the 1970s, Oesterheld is believed to have joined, following his four daughters, a leftist guerrilla group, the Montoneros. His story El Eternauta, Part II (1976) described a futuristic Argentina under a dictatorship.

In 1976 Oesterheld disappeared. He was last recorded as seen alive in late 1977 or early 1978. His family believed he was among the tens of thousands to have disappeared and been killed by the government. In 1977 his daughters, Diana (23), Beatriz (19), Estela (25) and Marina (18), were arrested by the Argentine armed forces in La Plata. None were seen again, and they were all presumed dead. His daughters' husbands also disappeared (desaparecidos).

One grandson, Martín, was born in captivity. Oesterheld's widow, Elsa Sánchez, learned about the boy and recovered him from government custody, although she never saw her daughter again. She raised Martin. A second grandson, Fernando, born earlier, was raised by his paternal grandparents.

Elsa Sánchez participated in the protests of the Mothers of the Plaza de Mayo. She became one of the spokeswomen for the Grandmothers of the Plaza de Mayo, which advocates for the return of children of the "disappeared" to their birth families.

When the Italian journalist Alberto Ongaro enquired about Oesterheld's disappearance in 1979, he received the reply: "We did away with him because he wrote the most beautiful story of Ché Guevara ever done". Argentine journalist Jacobo Timmerman, in his memoir of his own captivity, Prisoner Without a Name, Cell Without a Number (1981), recalls seeing Oesterheld in 1977 across the hall in a prison. In a report to the Argentine National Commission on the Disappearance of Persons, which published its findings in 1984 entitled Nunca Más, Eduardo Arias recalls seeing Oesterheld between November 1977 and January 1978. He said the man was in terrible physical condition and at the secret detention center El Vesubio, which prisoners had sardonically named "the Sheraton".

Legacy

Oesterheld worked with artists including Hugo Pratt, Alberto Breccia, Francisco Solano López, Ivo Pavone, Dino Battaglia, as well as Horacio Altuna, José Massaroli, Eugenio Zoppi, Paul Campani, Gustavo Trigo, Julio Schiaffino and others.

Bibliography

Early period
 Alan y Crazy, artwork by Eugenio Zoppi.
 Bull Rocket, artwork by Paul Campani, Francisco Solano López, and others
 El Sargento Kirk, artwork by Hugo Pratt and others
 Ray Kitt, artwork by Hugo Pratt.
 Tarpón, artwork by Daniel Haupt.
 Uma-Uma, artwork by Francisco Solano López
 Indio Suárez, artwork by Carlos Freixas and Carlos Cruz.

Ediciones Frontera
 Ticonderoga (1957), artwork by Hugo Pratt and Gisela Dexter
 Rolo, el marciano adoptivo (1957), artwork by Francisco Solano López
 Nahuel Barros (1957), artwork by Carlos Roume
 Ernie Pike (1957), artwork by Hugo Pratt, Francisco Solano López and others
 El Eternauta, artwork by Francisco Solano López
 Cayena (1958), artwork by Daniel Haupt
 Dr. Morgue (1959), artwork by Alberto Breccia
 Buster Pike (1959), artwork by Julio Schiaffino
 Randall, artwork by Arturo del Castillo
 Lacky Piedras, artwork by Carlos Cruz
 Tipp Kenya, artwork by Carlos Roume
 Verdugo Ranch, artwork by Ivo Pavone
 Patria vieja (1958), artwork by Carlos Roume and Juan Arancio
 Hueso clavado, artwork by Ivo Pavone
 Leonero Brent, artwork by Jorge Moliterni
 Rul de luna, artwork by Francisco Solano López and Horianski
 Capitán Lázaro, artwork by Enrique Cristóbal
 Pichi, artwork by Carlos Roume
 Sherlock Time, artwork by Alberto Breccia
 Tom de la pradera, artwork by Ernesto García Seijas
 Lord Crack, artwork by Hugo Pratt, Bertolini, Moliterni and Flores
 Amapola negra, artwork by Francisco Solano López
 Joe Zonda, artwork by Francisco Solano López and Julio Schiaffino
 Pereyra, taxista (1960), artwork by Leopoldo Durañona
 Mortimer, artwork by Rubén Sosa
 Doc Carson, artwork by Carlos Vogt
 Cachas de oro (1961), artwork by Carlos Vogt
 Santos Bravo, artwork by Arancio
 Historias de la ciudad grande, artwork by Leandro Sesarego, Ángel A. Fernández and García Seijas
 Paul Neutrón (1962), artwork by Schiaffino.

Third period
 Capitán Caribe (1961), artwork by Dino Battaglia
 El Eternauta "remake" (1969), artwork by Alberto Breccia
 Mort Cinder (1962), artwork by Alberto Breccia
 León Loco (1963), artwork by García Seijas
 Herida Mortal (1963), artwork by Durañona.
 Birdman (1964), artwork by Eugenio Zoppi.
 Futureman (1964), artwork by Eugenio Zoppi.
 Lord Pampa, artwork by Francisco Solano López
 Watami, artwork by Moliterni
 Artemio, el taxista de Buenos Aires, artwork by Néstor Olivera and Pablo Zahlut
 Tres por la ley, artwork by Marchionne and José Massaroli
 Argón el justiciero, artwork awing by Vogt
 Brigada Madeleine, artwork by Sierra
 Aakón, artwork by Ángel A. Fernández and José Massaroli
 Kabul de Bengala, artwork by Horacio Altuna
 Roland el Corsario, artwork by José Luis García López and others
 Marvo Luna, artwork by Francisco Solano López
 Russ Congo, artwork by Carlos Clement
 Loco Sexton, artwork by Arturo del Castillo
 Vida del Che (1968), artwork by Enrique and Alberto Breccia, biography of Che Guevara
 La guerra de los Antartes (1970), artwork by León Napoo and Gustavo Trigo
 Evita, vida y obra de Eva Perón (1970), artwork by Alberto Breccia, a biography of Eva Perón
 450 años de Guerra Contra el Imperialismo (1973), artwork by Leopoldo Durañona
 Nekrodamus (1975), artwork by Horacio Lalia
 Watami (1976), artwork by Jorge Moliterni
 El Eternauta II'' (1976), artwork by Francisco Solano López

Notes 
 Oesterheld bio FFF 
 Oesterheld albums Bedetheque

See also
 List of people who disappeared mysteriously: 1910–1990

References

External links

 Agrupación Oesterheld 
 Héctor Germán Oesterheld´s Historical Archives
 Héctor Germán Oesterheld biography on Lambiek Comiclopedia
 Héctor Germán Oesterheld biography on Historieteca 
 Héctor Germán Oesterheld biography on Henciclopedia 
 NonSports trading card Oesterheld article

1919 births
1970s missing person cases
1977 deaths
Argentine comics writers
Argentine people of Basque descent
Argentine people of German descent
Missing people
Missing person cases in Argentina
Montoneros
People from Buenos Aires
People killed in Operation Condor
People killed in the Dirty War